The dirham (abbreviation: د.إ in Arabic, Dh (singular) and Dhs (plural) or DH in Latin; ISO code: AED) is the official currency of the United Arab Emirates. The dirham is subdivided into 100 .

History 

The name dirham is a loan from greek δραχμή (drakhmé). Due to centuries of trade and usage of the currency, dirham survived through the Ottoman Empire.

Before 1966, all the emirates that now form the UAE used the Gulf rupee, which was pegged at parity to the Indian rupee. On 6 June 1966, India decided to devalue the Gulf rupee against the Indian rupee. Not accepting the devaluation, several of the states still using the Gulf rupee adopted their own or other currencies. All the Trucial States except Abu Dhabi adopted the Qatar and Dubai riyal, which was equal to the Gulf rupee prior to the devaluation. These emirates briefly adopted the Saudi riyal during the transition from the Gulf rupee to the Qatar and Dubai riyal. Abu Dhabi used the Bahraini dinar, at a rate of 10 Gulf rupees = 1 dinar. In 1973, the UAE adopted the UAE dirham as its currency. Abu Dhabi adopted the UAE dirham in place of the Bahraini dinar, at 1 dinar = 10 dirhams, while in the other emirates, the Qatar and Dubai riyal was exchanged at par.

Coins 
In 1973, coins were introduced in denominations of 1, 5, 10, 25, and 50 fils and 1 dirham. The 1, 5, and 10 fils are struck in bronze, with the higher denominations in cupro-nickel. The fils coins were the same size and composition as the corresponding Qatar and Dubai dirham coins. In 1995, the 5 fils, 10 fils, 50 fils, and 1 dirham coins were reduced in size, with the new 50 fils being curve-equilateral-heptagonal shaped.

The value and numbers on the coins are written in Eastern Arabic numerals and the text is in Arabic. The 1, 5 and 10 fils coins are rarely used in everyday life, so all amounts are rounded up or down to the nearest multiples of 25 fils. The 1 fils coin is a rarity and does not circulate significantly. In making a change there is a risk of confusing the old 50 fils coin for the modern 1 dirham coin because the coins are almost the same size.

Since 1976 the Currency Board of the United Arab Emirates has minted several commemorative coins celebrating different events and rulers of the United Arab Emirates. For details, see Commemorative coins of the United Arab Emirates dirham.

Issues with fraud 
By August 2006 it became publicly known that the Philippine one peso coin is the same size as one dirham. As 1 peso is only worth 8 fils, this has led to vending machine fraud in the UAE.
Pakistan's 5 rupee coin, the Omani 50 Baisa coin and the Moroccan 1 dirham are also the same sizes as the Emirati one dirham coin. Although 1mm thinner, one dirham coins have also been found in ten cent coin rolls in Australia. A falcon watermark is present on all dirham notes to prevent fraud.

Banknotes 
On 20 May 1973, the UAE Currency Board introduced notes in denominations of 1, 5, 10, 50, and 100 dirhams; a Dhs 1,000 note was issued on 3 January 1976. A second series of note was introduced in 1982 which omitted the Dh 1 and Dhs 1,000 notes. Dhs 500 notes were introduced in 1983, followed by Dhs 200 in 1989. Dhs 1,000 notes were reintroduced in 2000. Banknotes are currently available in denominations of Dhs 5 (brown), Dhs 10 (green), Dhs 20 (light blue), Dhs 50 (purple), Dhs 100 (pink), Dhs 200 (green/brown), Dhs 500 (navy blue) and Dhs 1,000 (greenish blue).

The obverse texts are written in Arabic with numbers in Eastern Arabic numerals; the reverse texts are in English with numbers in Arabic numerals. The 200 dirham denomination is scarce as it was only produced in 1989; any circulating today come from bank stocks. The 200 dirham denomination has since been reissued and is now in circulation since late May 2008 – it has been reissued in a different colour; Yellow/Brown to replace the older Green/Brown.

On 22 March 2008, The Central Bank of the United Arab Emirates released a Dhs 50 note. The security thread was a 3-mm wide, colour-shifting windowed security thread with demetalized UAE 50, and it bore the new coat of arms. On 7 December 2021, a redesigned polymer Dhs 50 note was released to commemorate the golden jubilee of the country on 2 December 2021, making it the UAE's first polymer banknote. Additional new polymer banknotes of Dhs 5 and Dhs 10 were introduced on 21 April 2022, with the Dhs 1000 set to be released on the first half of 2023.

Exchange rates 
On January 28, 1978, the dirham was officially pegged to the IMF's special drawing rights (SDRs). In practice, it is pegged to the U.S. dollar for most of the time. Since November 1997, the dirham has been pegged to the US dollar at a rate of US$1 = Dhs 3.6725, which translates to approximately Dh 1 = US$0.272294.

See also 
 Cooperation Council for the Arab States of the Gulf
 Economy of the United Arab Emirates

References

External links 

 United Arab Emirates Commemorative Coins
 UAE Dirham Currency Converter

Economy of the United Arab Emirates
Fixed exchange rate
1973 establishments in the United Arab Emirates
Currencies introduced in 1973
Currencies of the United Arab Emirates